The Set Up 2 is a 2022 Nigerian crime thriller film, a sequel to The Set Up released in 2019. The Nollywood sequel was jointly produced by Inkblot Productions, Film One Entertainment and Anakle Studios. The film was directed by Naz Onuzo instead of Niyi Akinmolayan, who directed the first part. The film stars Adesua Etomi, Kehinde Bankole, Nancy Isime, Jim Iyke, Tina Mba, Uzor Arukwe, Kate Henshaw, Blossom Chukwujekwu, Stan Nze,  Lota Chukwu and a host of others. The film was released in Nigeria on 12 August 2022.

Selected cast 

 Adesua Etomi
 Kehinde Bankole
 Nancy Isime
 Jim Iyke
 Kate Henshaw
 Tina Mba
 Uzor Arukwe
 Blossom Chukwujekwu
 Stan Nze
 Lota Chukwu
 Tope Olowoniyan

Synopsis 
The Set Up 2 is a sequel movie to The Set Up that was released in 2019. The movie follows Chike (Adesua Etomi)  four years after the events of the first film, who is still trying to come to term with the fact that she is now an agent for an international organization. Chike is forced to leave everything behind and go after a criminal named Usi (Nancy Isime) as things began to get complicated.

Premiere 
The Set Up 2 premiered on Sunday 7 August 2022 in Lagos at the IMAX film house cinema in the Lekki area of Lagos. In attendance were actors and actresses featured in the movie and a host of Nollywood actors and actresses that didn't feature in the movie, some of which are Tobi Bakre, Lala Akindoju, Jemima Osunde, Adunni Ade, Femi Adebayo, Mr Macaroni and others.

References 

Nigerian sequel films
2022 films
2022 crime thriller films
Nigerian crime thriller films
English-language Nigerian films
2020s English-language films
Films shot in Lagos